Edwin Nelson may refer to:
Edwin L. Nelson (1940–2003), United States federal judge
Ed Nelson (Edwin Stafford Nelson, 1928–2014), American actor
Edwin Nelson (politician) (1881–1961), Idaho politician

See also
Edward Nelson (disambiguation)